Benning is an unincorporated community in Lime Township, Blue Earth County, Minnesota, United States.

Notes

Unincorporated communities in Blue Earth County, Minnesota
Unincorporated communities in Minnesota